The Imatra shooting occurred on 4 December 2016 in the Finnish town of Imatra when Jori Juhani Lasonen, a 23-year-old Imatra resident, shot three people dead in the town centre.

According to the psychological evaluation, Lasonen was not criminally responsible at the time of the shootings. Therefore, The South Karelia District Court did not sentence him to prison, but instead committed him to involuntary psychiatric treatment.

Details
Just before midnight on Saturday, right outside a local restaurant in the town's shopping area, Jori Juhani Lasonen waited for vulnerable targets and chose, according to preliminary police investigations, random targets. However, one of the victims was a notable local politician.

The victims were exiting a restaurant when Lasonen opened fire at them, and they died shortly after. The casualties who were shot dead were the town's city council chair Tiina Wilén-Jäppinen, as well as two journalists. Aside from them, no one else sustained injuries or was killed.

References 

2016 in Finland
December 2016 crimes in Europe
Shooting
Spree shootings in Finland
2016 murders in Europe
2016 murders in Finland
2016 mass shootings in Europe